Mỹ Thái may refer to:

Mỹ Thái, Bắc Giang, a rural commune of Lạng Giang District
Mỹ Thái, Kiên Giang, a rural commune of Hòn Đất District